Immaculate Conception Church is a Roman Catholic parish church in Peterborough, Ontario, Canada. It is located at 386 Rogers Street in the city's East City neighbourhood. It was the third parish church established in Peterborough. The Neoclassical building was designed by Arthur W. Holmes and completed in 1930.

History
In 1914, to serve the rising population of the former Village of Ashburnham, Bishop M. J. O’Brien established the parish. A site beside the existing St. Joseph's Hospital and House of Providence was chosen and the basement of the church was completed and consecrated on December 6, 1914. In 1930, Bishop Denis O'Connor ordered the construction of the rest of the church which had been on hold since the outbreak of the First World War. The Neoclassical building was designed by Arthur W. Holmes was completed and solemnly blessed on December 8, 1933. A major restoration was undertaken in 1998. Accessibility to the church was improved in 2019.

In 2005, the care of the church became entrusted to the Franciscans under the leadership of Fr. Jerzy Żebrowski. Fr. Żebrowski began offering services in Polish.

References

External links
 

Churches in Peterborough, Ontario
Roman Catholic churches in Ontario
Roman Catholic churches completed in 1930
20th-century Roman Catholic church buildings in Canada
1930 establishments in Ontario
Neoclassical church buildings in Canada